The Phú Mỹ Bridge is a cable-stayed road bridge over the Saigon River in Ho Chi Minh City, Vietnam.

The bridge was constructed from March 2007 to September 2009 by a consortium consisting of Baulderstone, Bilfinger Berger, Freyssinet (cable stays and stressing), and the Vietnamese company CC620 (concrete, formwork, etc.) and was designed by the French consultant Arcadis (design of the main bridge) and Cardno (design of the approaches). The project manager for the project was AECOM.

The Phu My Bridge is 705 metres long across the river, with a main span of 380 metres and the approach viaduct structures on either side of the river are approximately 758m and 638m long respectively. The modified H-shaped main towers, which are 145m high, support a 27m wide main span deck. It has six lanes of traffic; two lanes of vehicle traffic in each direction, and a separate lane for motorbikes and pedestrian footways. The bridge will connect District 2 on the north side of the river to District 7 and forms part of a new ring road currently being built around the south and east of Ho Chi Minh City.

The bridge was officially opened to traffic in a ceremony attended by the Prime Minister of Vietnam, Nguyễn Tấn Dũng, along with other Vietnamese and Australian government officials, on 2 September 2009.

Phu My Bridge Corporation (PMC) has a thirty-year BOT licence to operate the bridge which will be part of a toll road. PMC is a private consortium comprising Hanoi Construction Company, Investco, Cienco 620, Thanh Danh Co, and CII. The project was privately financed by PMC along with export credit guarantees from Germany, France and Australia. As part of the financing arrangements almost half of the contract expenditure must be in these three countries. These three aspects of the project (private sector infrastructure, private sector BOT scheme, and export credit finance) are all firsts for Vietnam.

External links 

 Phú Mỹ Bridge at Structurae Database

Transport in Ho Chi Minh City
Road bridges in Vietnam
Bridges over the Saigon River
Cable-stayed bridges in Vietnam
Toll bridges in Vietnam
Bridges completed in 2009
Buildings and structures in Ho Chi Minh City